In Control Volume II (For Your Steering Pleasure) is the second studio album by American hip hop record producer Marley Marl. It was released in 1991 via Cold Chillin' Records. Recording sessions took place at Marley's House Of Hits in Chestnut Ridge, New York. Production was handled by Marley Marl himself, with Benny Medina, Francesca Spero and Tyrone Williams serving as executive producers. It features guest appearances from Tragedy Khadafi, Big Daddy Kane, Craig G, Heavy D, Kool G Rap and Masta Ace, who contributed on In Control, Volume 1, as well as Big Money Wiz, Chubb Rock, Chuck D, Def Jef, Eclipse, Grand Puba, Kev-E-Kev & AK-B, King Tee, Little Daddy Shane, LL Cool J, MC Amazing, MC Cash, Mike Nice, Nexx Phase, Perfection, Portia Kirkland, Pure Cane Sugar, Rap Industry For Social Evolution and The Flex. Action, Biz Markie, MC Shan and Roxanne Shanté did not appear on this album.

The album peaked at number 152 on the Billboard 200 and number 46 on the Top R&B/Hip-Hop Albums in the United States. It spawned two singles: "The Symphony, Pt. II", a sequel to 1988 song "The Symphony", and "Check the Mirror". Its lead single, "The Symphony, Pt. II", made it to number nine on the Hot Rap Songs.

Track listing

Personnel 

 Marlon "Marley Marl" Williams – main artist, producer, recording, mixing
 Duval "Masta Ace" Clear – featured artist (track 3)
 Craig "Craig G" Curry – featured artist (track 3)
 Antonio "Big Daddy Kane" Hardy – featured artist (track 3)
 Nathaniel "Kool G Rap" Wilson – featured artist (track 3)
 Clayton "Little Daddy Shane" Hardy – featured artist (track 3)
 Joseph "Amazin'" Chong – featured artist (track 5)
 Mitchell "MC Cash" Ellington – featured artist (track 7)
 Liel Williams – featured artist (track 9)
 Percy "Tragedy Khadafi" Chapman – featured artist (tracks: 10, 18)
 Carlton "Chuck D" Ridenhour – featured artist (track 10)
 Portia Kirkland – featured artist (track 11)
 James "LL Cool J" Smith – featured artist (track 12)
 Darren Lighty – featured artist (tracks: 13, 17), keyboards, programming
 Clifton Lighty – featured artist (tracks: 13, 17)
 Eric Williams – featured artist (tracks: 13, 17)
 Dwight "Heavy D" Myers – featured artist (track 14)
 Damien Blyden – featured artist (track 14)
 Walter "Big Money Wiz" Nichols – featured artist (track 15)
 Michael Condon – featured artist (track 16)
 Ike Lee – featured artist (track 16)
 Cherelle Wright – featured artist (track 17)
 Roger "King Tee" McBride – featured artist (track 18)
 Maxwell "Grand Puba" Dixon – featured artist (track 18)
 Jeffrey "Def Jef" Fortson – featured artist (track 18)
 Richard "Chubb Rock" Simpson – featured artist (track 18)
 Rap Industry For Social Evolution – featured artist (track 18)
 Lawrence Walford – featured artist (track 19)
 David Donnell – featured artist (track 19)
 Kevin "Kev-E-Kev" Thompson – featured artist (track 20)
 Oliver "AK-B" Levy – featured artist (track 20)
 Everett Ramos – engineering
 Frank Heller – engineering
 John Pace – engineering
 Peter Jorge – assistant engineering
 DJ Clash – assistant engineering
 Howie Weinberg – mastering
 Francesca Spero – executive producer, management
 Benny Medina – executive producer
 Tyrone Williams – executive producer
 JoDee Stringham – art direction, design
 Mark Seliger – photography
 Dee Joseph Garner – coordinator
 Karen Jones – A&R, management

Charts

References

External links 
 

1991 albums
Marley Marl albums
Cold Chillin' Records albums
Albums produced by Marley Marl